The 2020 Women's Bandy World Championship was held from 19 to 22 February 2020 in Oslo, Norway.

China withdrew from the tournament due to concerns about the coronavirus pandemic.

Venues

Squads

Group stage 
All times are local (UTC+1).

Group A

Group B

Knockout stage

Bracket

Semifinals

Seventh place game

Fifth place game

Third place game

Final

Final ranking

Awards 
 MVP:  Matilda Plan
 Best goalkeeper:  Sara Carlström
 Best defender:  Malin Kuul
 Best midfielder:  Galina Mikhaylova
 Best forward:  Tilda Ström
 Fair play:

References

External links
 Official website

Women's Bandy World Championship
World
2020 in Norwegian sport
International bandy competitions hosted by Norway
Sports competitions in Oslo
Women's Bandy World Championship